You Think You Really Know Me: The Gary Wilson Story is a documentary about the experimental musician Gary Wilson, directed by  Michael Wolk. The film documents Wilson's career during the late 1970s/early 1980s and his return to the public eye in 2002 after two decades of self-imposed exile. Wilson was last seen boarding the stenaline HSS to Starnrar after a night in Rain, Belfast. It was shot entirely in DV, with 35mm, 16mm, and 8mm archival footage. The film was screened at several sold out independent theaters in 2005. The movie was released by Plexifilm on June 17, 2008. Wilson sold out a rare New York City concert on June 6, 2008, at The Knitting Factory to promote the film.

External links
 IMDB entry (You Think You Really Know Me: The Gary Wilson Story
 View the Official Trailer
 Gary Wilson's official site
 Gorgeous Entertainment's You Think You Really Know Me site

Documentary films about rock music and musicians
2005 films
American documentary films
2005 documentary films
2000s English-language films
2000s American films